Rozália Ökrész (born 2 November 1957) is a Serbian politician from the country's Hungarian community. She has served in the National Assembly of Serbia since 2020 as a member of the Alliance of Vojvodina Hungarians (Vajdasági Magyar Szövetség, VMSZ).

Private career
Ökrész is a graduated economist living in Temerin. She became the director of Magyar Szó (English: Hungarian Word), the leading Hungarian-language newspaper in Vojvodina, in 2012 and remained in this role until her resignation on November 2022. She has also worked in Vojvodina's secretariat of education and culture and served on the board of directors of the Clinical Center of Vojvodina.

Politician

Local politics (2004–16)
Ökrész received the twenty-fourth position on the VMSZ's electoral list for the Temerin municipal assembly in the 2004 Serbian local elections. The party won three seats, and she was not elected. She later appeared in the lead position on the party's list for Temerin in the 2012 local elections and was elected when the list again won three seats. She served in the local assembly for the term that followed and was not a candidate for re-election in 2016.

Parliamentarian (2020–present)
Ökrész appeared in the sixteenth position on the VMSZ's list in the 2014 Serbian parliamentary election. The list won six seats, and she was not elected.

The VMSZ led a successful drive to increase its voter turnout in the 2020 parliamentary election and won a record nine seats. Ökrész, who appeared in the tenth position on the party's list, was not immediately elected but received a mandate on 1 December 2020 as the replacement for Annamária Vicsek, who had been appointed to a secretary of state position. In her first term, Ökrész was a member of the culture and information committee and the committee on the rights of the child; a deputy member of the committee on finance, state budget, and control of public spending; a deputy member of the committee on labour, social issues, social inclusion, and poverty reduction; and a member of the parliamentary friendship groups with Finland and Portugal.

She was promoted to the fifth position on the VMSZ's list in the 2022 parliamentary election and was re-elected when the list won five mandates. She is now a member of the culture and information committee and the finance committee; a deputy member of the labour committee, the European integration committee, and the committee on the rights of the child; a member of the subcommittee for the consideration of reports on audits conducted by the state audit institution; a substitute member of Serbia's delegation to the parliamentary dimension of the Central European Initiative; and a member of the parliamentary friendship groups with Croatia, France, and Slovakia.

References

1957 births
Living people
People from Temerin
Hungarians in Vojvodina
Serbian journalists
Members of the National Assembly (Serbia)
Substitute members of the Parliamentary Dimension of the Central European Initiative
Alliance of Vojvodina Hungarians politicians
Women members of the National Assembly (Serbia)